Danio kyathit is a small, schooling species of fish in the family Cyprinidae. It is endemic to the upper reaches of Irrawaddy River near Myitkyina in northern Myanmar. Described in 1998, it is closely related to the better-known zebrafish or zebra danio, D. rerio.

Description

The two recognised colour morphs are a striped form known as the orange-finned danio, and a spotted form known by the common name ocelot danio, which may be confused with the leopard danio. Individual fish may show variations in markings intermediate to the spotted and striped forms.

References

External links
 Danios.info – Danio kyathit

Danio
Cyprinid fish of Asia
Fish of Myanmar
Endemic fauna of Myanmar
Taxa named by Fang Fang Kullander
Fish described in 1998